The Atelostomata are a type of sea urchins. They are distinguished from other sea urchins by their irregular shape and the absence of a feeding lantern. The group includes the well known heart urchins, as well as some less familiar and extinct forms.

List of orders 
 order Holasteroida (Durham & Melville, 1957)
 order Spatangoida (L. Agassiz, 1840)

References
 
 

Echinoidea
Animal superorders